Avenue Foch is an avenue in the 16th arrondissement of Paris, France, named after World War I Marshal Ferdinand Foch.

Avenue Foch may also refer to:

People 
 Ferdinand Foch (1851–1929), French general who served as Supreme Allied Commander during the First World War

Places 
 84 Avenue Foch, the Parisian headquarters of the counter-intelligence branch of the SS during the German occupation of Paris
 Avenue Foch station, a station in Paris's express suburban rail system
 Yan'an Road, a road in Shanghai, China, formerly called Avenue Foch

See also
 Marshal Ferdinand Foch Street in Bydgoszcz
 Foch Street, Beirut, Lebanon